The Fifth Army was a fighting force that participated in World War I. Under its commander, Louis Franchet d'Espèrey, it led the attacks which resulted in the victory at the First Battle of the Marne in 1914.

World War I

Commanders 
General Lanrezac (Mobilization - 3 September 1914)
General Franchet d'Espérey (3 September 1914 - 31 March 1916)
General Mazel (31 March 1916 - 22 May 1917)
Fought in the Second Battle of the Aisne
General Micheler (22 May 1917 - 10 June 1918)
General Buat (10 June 1918 - 5 July 1918)
General Berthelot (5 July 1918 - 7 October 1918)
General Guillaumat (7 October 1918 - Armistice)

Notable People 
During the first World War, Louis II of Monaco served as a Brigadier General.

World War II

Commanders 
General Victor Bourret (2 September 1939 – 26 June 1940)

References

See also 
List of French armies in WWI

Field armies of France in World War I
Field armies of France
Military units and formations established in 1914
1914 establishments in France